Robert Samuel Haas (1898–1997) was a Viennese-born calligrapher, typographer, photographer, art collector and book designer. He emigrated to the United States in 1939.

From 1939 to 1940 he taught calligraphy and photography at Goddard College. He also taught at Cooper Union.

References

Further reading
 Austrian Information Services (1993). Austrian Information, Item notes: v. 46-47. New York: Austrian Information Services, 1993. Google Books
 Gale Research Company (1987). Contemporary graphic artists. Gale Research Co., 1987 , 
 Madison, Paul with Herman Zapf (1984). Robert Haas: Printing, Calligraphy, Photography. Friends of the Fairleigh Dickinson Library
 Robert Haas: Framing Two Worlds. Exhibition catalogue review http://www.cosmopolis.ch/english/art/e0019800/robert_haas_e019800.htm

Austrian typographers and type designers
1898 births
1997 deaths